Anthony A. Martin (born August 31, 1948) is a Canadian politician. He was a member of the Legislative Assembly of Ontario from 1990 to 2003, representing the constituency of Sault Ste. Marie for the Ontario New Democratic Party (NDP).  Thereafter, he was elected to the House of Commons of Canada in 2004, representing Sault Ste. Marie until 2011.

Background
Martin was raised in Wawa, Ontario, and received a Bachelor of Arts degree from Laurentian University in 1974.  Later in the same year, he received a Diploma in Recreational Leadership from Confederation College. He was the founder of the Sault Ste. Marie Soup Kitchen, and was for some time the owner and General Manager of Transcend Homes, a local workers' cooperative. A devout Roman Catholic, Martin also served as a trustee on the Northern District Catholic School Board and was a pastoral assistant at the Blessed Sacrament Parish in Sault Ste. Marie from 1981 to 1990.

Martin is married to Anna Celetti. They have four children.

On February 9, 2014, Martin was hospitalized in Sault Ste. Marie after suffering a stroke.

Provincial politics
Martin ran for the Ontario legislature in the provincial election of 1990 after Karl Morin-Strom, the sitting Member of Provincial Parliament (MPP) for Sault Ste. Marie, announced his retirement. He faced a difficult challenge in retaining the seat for his party. The Ontario Liberal Party ran a strong candidate in Don MacGregor, while the upstart anti-bilingualism Confederation of Regions Party made strong inroads into the riding's anglophone/working-class base, which traditionally votes NDP. Martin ultimately won the seat by only 697 votes over MacGregor, after a late drive from the city's unions. Elsewhere in the province, the NDP won several historical breakthroughs and formed government for the first time in its history.

Martin was appointed as parliamentary assistant to the Minister of Education for the next five years.  The New Democrat Government under the leadership of Bob Rae (with significant help from Shelley Martel Nickel Belt MPP and Bud Wildman Algoma MPP) facilitated a unique restructuring at Algoma Steel in Sault Ste. Marie that included majority worker ownership during the early 1990s, which contributed to Martin retaining the riding in the 1995 election with an increased majority, even as the NDP suffered major losses in most parts of the province.  Martin defeated Carmen Provenzano of the Liberal Party by almost 4,000 votes, and so became one of only seventeen New Democrats to return to the legislature.

Martin again retained his seat in the 1999 election.  He was appointed as one of the legislature's Deputy Speakers on October 25, 1999. He dramatically resigned from this position on December 19, 2000, to protest the Mike Harris government's inactivity on poverty issues. Following this, he chaired a series of "People's Parliament on Poverty" meetings.  In 2002-03, Martin supported Bill Blaikie's campaign to lead the federal NDP.

Martin was initially expected to be re-elected in the 2003 provincial election, but a late surge in Liberal support saw David Orazietti win the seat by a significant margin.

Federal politics
Shortly after his provincial loss, Martin was nominated as the federal NDP's candidate for the general election of 2004.

Sault Ste. Marie's vulnerable industrial economy and strong union base and the NDP's populist strength in Northern Ontario made the riding a prime target for the party.  Martin won by almost 1,000 votes, once again defeating incumbent Liberal Carmen Provenzano, who had taken the seat in the 1997 election.  Martin was re-elected in the 2006 campaign, as the NDP increased its representation from 19 seats to 29.

In the NDP's shadow cabinet, Martin was critic for Social Policy, Childcare, Human Resources and Skills Development and the FedNor agency. Martin was defeated by Conservative candidate Bryan Hayes in the 2011 federal election.

References

External links
 
 

1948 births
People from County Louth
Canadian activists
Canadian Roman Catholics
Canadian anti-poverty activists
Irish emigrants to Canada
Laurentian University alumni
Living people
Members of the House of Commons of Canada from Ontario
New Democratic Party MPs
Ontario New Democratic Party MPPs
People from Drogheda
People from Sault Ste. Marie, Ontario
Politicians from County Louth
21st-century Canadian politicians